Big Diomede Island (Ratmanov Island, ; ; or Tomorrow Island, due to the International Date Line) is the western island of the two Diomede Islands in the middle of the Bering Strait. The island is a part of the Chukotsky District of the Chukotka Autonomous Okrug of Russia. The border separating Russia and the United States runs north–south between the Diomede Islands.

Geography

The highest point of the island is at 65°46'24.64" N, 169°04'06.61" W where the elevation reaches .

History
The island was originally inhabited by Iñupiat. The First Alaskans Institute says: "The people of the Diomede and King Islands are Inupiat".

The first European to reach the islands was the Russian explorer Semyon Dezhnyov in 1648. Vitus Bering landed on the Diomede Islands on August 16, 1728, the day on which the Russian Orthodox Church celebrates the memory of the martyr St. Diomede.

In 1732, the Russian geodesist Mikhail Gvozdev plotted the island's map.

In 1867, during the Alaska Purchase, the new border between the nations was drawn between the Big Diomede and Little Diomede islands.

20th century
During World War II, Big Diomede became a military base, and remained so for some time into the Cold War.

After World War II, the native population was forced off Big Diomede Island to the mainland in order to avoid contacts across the border. Today, unlike Alaska's neighboring Little Diomede Island, it has no permanent native population, but it is the site of a Russian weather station and a base of Border Service of the Federal Security Service of the Russian Federation troops (FSB).

During the Cold War, the section of the border between the U.S. and the USSR separating Big and Little Diomede became known as the "Ice Curtain". On 7 August 1987, however, Lynne Cox, an American long-distance swimmer, swam from Little Diomede to Big Diomede (approximately ) in ice-cold waters.  She was congratulated jointly by Mikhail Gorbachev and Ronald Reagan four months later at the signing of the INF Missile Treaty at the White House, when Gorbachev made a toast. He and President Reagan lifted their glasses and Gorbachev said: "Last summer it took one brave American by the name of Lynne Cox just two hours to swim from one of our countries to the other. We saw on television how sincere and friendly the meeting was between our people and the Americans when she stepped onto the Soviet shore. She proved by her courage how close to each other our peoples live".

Lisunov Li-2 crash
There is no airstrip on the island, but being flat on the top, some landings were carried out in order to deliver supplies. On 13 June 1971 a Lisunov Li-2 belonging to the Soviet Border Troops crashed in the centre of the island.

Fauna
Eleven species of birds including such as puffins and guillemots have been found on Big Diomede. In 1976 a rufous hummingbird was identified on the island. This finding, unique so far in Russia, was very likely due to a dispersed specimen. For mammals, pinnipeds (e.g. ringed and bearded seals, walruses) and cetaceans (e.g. gray and rarer bowhead whales) inhabit the waters around the island.

See also
 List of islands of Russia

References

Islands of the Chukchi Sea
Islands of the Bering Sea
Islands of Chukotka Autonomous Okrug
Populated places of Arctic Russia
Former populated places in Russia
Bering Strait
Diomede Islands